Hepeviridae is a family of viruses. Human, pig, wild boar, sheep, cow, camel, monkey, some rodents, bats and chickens serve as natural hosts. There are two genera in the family. Diseases associated with this family include: hepatitis; high mortality rate during pregnancy; and avian hepatitis E virus is the cause of hepatitis-splenomegaly (HS) syndrome among chickens.

Taxonomy
The following genera are assigned to the family:
 Orthohepevirus
 Piscihepevirus

A third genus has been proposed — Insecthepevirus. This proposed genus contains one species — Sogatella furcifera hepe-like virus.

A species — Crustacea hepe-like virus 1, has been isolated from a prawn (Macrobrachium rosenbergii).

Structure
Viruses in the family Hepeviridae are non-enveloped, with icosahedral and spherical geometries, and T=1 symmetry. The diameter is around 32-34 nm. Genomes are linear and non-segmented, around 7.2kb in length. The genome has three open reading frames.

Evolution
This has been studied by examining the ORF1 and the capsid proteins. The ORF1 protein appears to be related to members of the Alphatetraviridae - a member of the "Alpha-like" super-group of viruses - while the capsid protein is related to that of the chicken astrovirus capsid - a member of the "Picorna-like" supergroup. This suggests that a recombination event at some point in the past between at least two distinct viruses gave rise to the ancestor of this family. This recombination event occurred at the junction of the structural and non structural proteins.

Life cycle
Entry into the host cell is achieved by attachment of the virus to host receptors, which mediates clathrin-mediated endocytosis. Replication follows the positive stranded RNA virus replication model. Positive stranded rna virus transcription is the method of transcription. Translation takes place by leaky scanning. Human, pig, wild boar, monkey, cow, sheep, camel some rodents, bat and chicken serve as the natural host. Transmission routes are zoonosis and fomite.

References

External links
 ICTV Online (10th) Report Hepeviridae
 Viralzone: Hepeviridae

 
Virus families
Riboviria